Ayish Bayou is a river in Texas. The course of the stream runs southeast for  through the center of the county, before discharging into the Angelina River in northern Jasper County, Texas

See also
List of rivers of Texas

References

USGS Geographic Names Information Service
USGS Hydrologic Unit Map - State of Texas (1974)

Rivers of Texas
Rivers of San Augustine County, Texas
Rivers of Jasper County, Texas